The Boys' 66 kg tournament in Judo at the 2014 Summer Youth Olympics was held on August 17 at the Longjiang Gymnasium.

This event was the second lightest of the boy's judo weight classes, limiting competitors to a maximum of 66 kilograms of body mass. The tournament bracket consisted of a single-elimination contest culminating in a gold medal match. There was also a repechage to determine the winners of the two bronze medals. Each judoka who had lost before the finals competed in the repechage with the two finalists getting bronze medals.

Results

Main Bracket

Repechage

References
 Judo Contest Sheet Results
 Official Judo Results Book

B66
Judo at the Youth Olympics Boys' 66 kg